Pavel Janeček (born 4 September 1968) is a retired Czech football midfielder.

References

1968 births
Living people
Czech footballers
FC Hradec Králové players
FC Slovan Liberec players
FC Fastav Zlín players
AFK Atlantic Lázně Bohdaneč players
Bohemians 1905 players
SK Spolana Neratovice players
SK Kladno players
Czechoslovak First League players
Czech First League players
Association football midfielders